Novoposelenovka is a rural locality in Novoposelenovsky Selsoviet Rural Settlement, Kursky District, Kursk Oblast, Russia. Population:

Geography 
The village is located 81 km from the Russia–Ukraine border, 8 km south-west of Kursk, at the northern border of the selsoviet center – 1st Tsvetovo.

 Streets
There are two streets in the locality: Druzhby and Mirnaya (226 houses).

 Climate
Novoposelenovka has a warm-summer humid continental climate (Dfb in the Köppen climate classification).

Transport 
Novoposelenovka is located 1.5 km from the federal route  Crimea Highway (a part of the European route ), on the road of intermunicipal significance  ("Crimea Highway" – 1st Tsvetovo – Novoposelenovka), in the vicinity of the nearest railway halt 457 km (railway line Lgov I — Kursk).

The rural locality is situated 18 km from Kursk Vostochny Airport, 115 km from Belgorod International Airport and 217 km from Voronezh Peter the Great Airport.

References

Notes

Sources

Rural localities in Kursky District, Kursk Oblast